The 1992 German Grand Prix was a Formula One motor race held at the Hockenheimring in Hockenheim, Germany on 26 July 1992. It was the tenth race of the 1992 Formula One World Championship.

The 45-lap race was won from pole position by Englishman Nigel Mansell, driving a Williams-Renault, with Brazilian Ayrton Senna second in a McLaren-Honda and local driver Michael Schumacher third in a Benetton-Ford.

Pre-race
The Ostkurve chicane was modified for this race from a quick left-right gap into a turning sequence, after there were safety concerns with the chicane the previous year, when Érik Comas had a major accident there in his Ligier.

Qualifying

Pre-qualifying report
The Friday morning pre-qualifying session again followed the familiar pattern, with the Andrea Moda cars failing to pre-qualify. Gabriele Tarquini was fastest in the session for Fondmetal, just ahead of Larrousse driver Bertrand Gachot. Just over eight tenths of a second slower was Gachot's team-mate Ukyo Katayama, with Fondmetal's Andrea Chiesa, back in the newer GR02, the fourth and final pre-qualifier.

Andrea Moda's Roberto Moreno was fifth fastest as usual, although on this occasion he was much closer to Chiesa, just 0.376 of a second slower despite an engine failure. Perry McCarthy had managed one lap and was slowest, but his time was deleted after he missed a weightcheck and was excluded.

Pre-qualifying classification

Qualifying report
Nigel Mansell qualified on pole position, ahead of Riccardo Patrese and Ayrton Senna. Stefano Modena, Eric van de Poele, Andrea Chiesa and Damon Hill were the four drivers who did not qualify for the race. For Chiesa, it proved to be the last time he took part in a Grand Prix event, as he was replaced for the next race at the Fondmetal team by van de Poele.

Qualifying classification

Race

Race report
At the start, Mansell took an early lead from teammate Patrese, with Senna in third. Mansell made a scheduled pitstop and quickly caught Senna, who chose to run the race without a pitstop. Aguri Suzuki spun off at the Sachs Kurve on lap 2. Ukyo Katayama also retired after spinning off only seven laps later, and Gerhard Berger retired in the pits with electrical problems on lap 17 as he had a long stop for tyres. On lap 19, Mansell cut the corner at the OstKurve chicane, exited faster, and passed Senna on the following straight. Mansell was not penalised. Meanwhile further back, Ivan Capelli retired with engine trouble on lap 22, as did both the Lotus cars of Mika Häkkinen and Johnny Herbert, retiring with the same problems by lap 24.

On the last lap, Riccardo Patrese spun off whilst trying to pass Ayrton Senna for second position. He was ultimately classified in eighth position. Mansell held on for the race victory, ahead of Senna in second, whose McLaren car ran out of fuel shortly after crossing the finish line and Michael Schumacher in third. 

Mansell tied the record from Ayrton Senna in 1988 for most wins in a season with eight, accomplished in only ten races.

Ayrton Senna dropped out of title contention at this race, although it seemed inevitable that only Mansell would be Driver's Champion anyway – he clinched the title at the next race in Hungary.

Race classification

Championship standings after the race

Drivers' Championship standings

Constructors' Championship standings

References

German Grand Prix
German Grand Prix
Grand Prix
German Grand Prix